Matuto is a blues band based in New York City, United States. They are an international touring band. They are signed with Ropeadope Records.

The term Matuto (pronounced "ma-two-toe") is a Brazilian slang word for "country bumpkin."

History
Clay Ross and Rob Curto officially started the band on February 28, 2009 when they played the massive REC BEAT festival on the Sunday of Brazilian Carnival in Recife. They have since performed internationally at venues and festivals including Chicago World Music Festival, Madison World Music Festival, Expressions of Brazil Festival, Ingenuity Fest Cleveland, LEAF Festival, The Philadelphia Folk Festival, The Grassroots Festival, The Kennedy Center, Summer Dance Chicago, The Krannert Center, REC BEAT Festival, Garanhuns Jazz Festival, The Blue Note Jazz Club, Musikfest, and many more.

The members of Matuto have worked with Herbie Hancock, Chick Corea, Esperanza Spalding, Cyro Baptista, Tony Trischka, Steve Martin, Bela Fleck, Phoebe Snow, Southside Johnny and the Asbury Jukes, Cyndi Lauper, Cassandra Wilson, Abigail Washburn, "Dizzy" Daniel Moorehead, The Wild Colonials, Lila Downs, Yo Yo Ma, Lee Konitz, The Klezmatics, Fred Hersch, Kenny Werner, Natalie Merchant, David Krakauer, Pete Seeger.

Awards
2009 - Fulbright Grant - Recife, Brazil
2011 - Selected as Official Showcasing Artists for Womex
2012 - Selected as American Musical Ambassadors for the U.S. State Department

Albums
Matuto - Released on November 18, 2011 on Galileo MC
The Devil and the Diamond - Released on May 14, 2013 on Motema Music

References

External links
Official website
DownBeat

Musical groups from New York City
American world music groups
Musical groups established in 2009
Motéma Music artists
Ropeadope Records artists